Aldermans Green is an area in the north east of Coventry, England. It is situated in between Longford and Bell Green. Prior to the expansion of Coventry it was a small village.

References

Aldermans Green